Peter Dean (born 9 March 1965) is a former Australian rules footballer who played for Carlton from 1984 to 1998 as a defender. From South Bendigo, Dean won two premierships with Carlton, in 1987 and 1995. After retiring, Dean was also a runner for the Blues. In 2015 Carlton named its father–son academy the Peter Dean Father–Son Academy.

Career

Peter Dean played 248 games and kicked 41 highly celebrated goals in a career that spanned 15 seasons. He was the ultimate team man, which made him one of the most respected players ever to pull on the Navy Blue jumper. 

In his debut season, he managed 13 games and capped off a solid debut season with a 3-goal effort in the losing First Semi-Final against Collingwood. 

Surprisingly, he began 1985 in the reserves and had to wait till Round 5 for a recall. He would play the rest of the season and finish a respectable 8th in the best and fairest with his ability to spoil as well as a willingness to springboard out of defence; this was a major boon for Carlton at the time, as the backline was going through a transitional stage due to the retirement of Geoff Southby the season before and the ageing veterans Austin and Doull only playing minimal matches in 1985. 

In 1986, Dean earned Victorian selection as he continued to forge a reputation in defence. A member of the beaten Grand Final side, Dean would once again finish 8th in the B&F. 

In 1987, he found himself dropped late in the season but was recalled for the finals where he was given the task of playing on the Preliminary Final hero Gary Buckenara in the Grand Final. Dean would keep the Hawk star goalless which went a long way in ensuring victory for the Blues. At the medal presentation, Dean grabbed the microphone and paid tribute to "Mots, Dessie and bloody Bernie", which summed up the spirit at Carlton at the time. 

1988, however, proved a frustrating one. Dean would sustain a serious hip injury in Round 3 and miss the remainder of the season which was a big blow to the club's premiership hopes. Such was the injury, he wouldn't return to senior action until Round 9 in 1989 in a season that was already on the rails with the soon-to-be departed Robert Walls replaced by Alex Jesaulenko. Dean managed 11 games in 1989. 

Fortunately, in 1990, he managed some continuity and played 17 games, finishing 5th in the best and fairest. Reunited with his first coach David Parkin in 1991, Dean really stood up in a difficult season, playing all 22 games and recording 4th place in the best and fairest. 

In 1992, he continued to be a pillar down back, but injuries would once again deprive him of September action in 1993 when he sustained a foot injury two weeks out of the finals, thus ruling him out of the finals series. Given what took place on Grand Final day, his presence was sorely missed. It seemed to drive him to a new level in 1994, as he really was now the General of the backline with his frenetic desperation and willingness to sacrifice his own game for the betterment of the team. Dean would record his only top-three finish in the best and fairest and go on to win Best Clubman. 

1995 allowed Dean the opportunity to taste his second premiership, and he was a major factor. Despite suffering a bruising bump the week before in the preliminary final, courtesy of Wayne Schwass, Dean was superb in the grand final and was considered one of the best three afield in the comprehensive win. In s 

In 1996, a broken arm saw him restricted to 8 games including his final two finals appearances. 

In 1997, at age 32, he managed 20 games and continued to thrill the Carlton faithful with one-percenters and the odd visit up forward. Playing on again in 1998, his battle-weary body saw his impact diminished. He would often start games on the bench and see little game time. He even spent periods in the Reserves. Dean would play 13 games and was fittingly chaired off in his final appearance for the Blues v Port Adelaide in Round 22 to fall just two games shy of 250. 

Such is the esteem Dean is held at Carlton, the club have named their father–son academy after him. He was renowned for making inspirational smothers, the willingness to stand in the hole in front of oncoming forwards, and his dedication to Carlton.

Statistics

|-
|- style="background-color: #EAEAEA"
! scope="row" style="text-align:center" | 1984
|style="text-align:center;"|
| 35 || 13 || 6 || 0 || 115 || 64 || 179 || 48 ||  || 0.5 || 0.0 || 8.8 || 4.9 || 13.8 || 3.7 ||  || 2
|-
! scope="row" style="text-align:center" | 1985
|style="text-align:center;"|
| 35 || 19 || 2 || 5 || 171 || 86 || 257 || 73 ||  || 0.1 || 0.3 || 9.0 || 4.5 || 13.5 || 3.8 ||  || 1
|- style="background-color: #EAEAEA"
! scope="row" style="text-align:center" | 1986
|style="text-align:center;"|
| 35 || 24 || 3 || 2 || 167 || 151 || 318 || 84 ||  || 0.1 || 0.1 || 7.0 || 6.3 || 13.3 || 3.5 ||  || 0
|-
|style="text-align:center;background:#afe6ba;"|1987†
|style="text-align:center;"|
| 35 || 19 || 2 || 4 || 111 || 118 || 229 || 54 || 21 || 0.1 || 0.2 || 5.8 || 6.2 || 12.1 || 2.8 || 1.1 || 0
|- style="background-color: #EAEAEA"
! scope="row" style="text-align:center" | 1988
|style="text-align:center;"|
| 35 || 3 || 0 || 0 || 21 || 17 || 38 || 12 || 4 || 0.0 || 0.0 || 7.0 || 5.7 || 12.7 || 4.0 || 1.3 || 0
|-
! scope="row" style="text-align:center" | 1989
|style="text-align:center;"|
| 35 || 11 || 0 || 5 || 79 || 45 || 124 || 31 || 21 || 0.0 || 0.5 || 7.2 || 4.1 || 11.3 || 2.8 || 1.9 || 3
|- style="background-color: #EAEAEA"
! scope="row" style="text-align:center" | 1990
|style="text-align:center;"|
| 35 || 17 || 2 || 0 || 175 || 83 || 258 || 70 || 18 || 0.1 || 0.0 || 10.3 || 4.9 || 15.2 || 4.1 || 1.1 || 0
|-
! scope="row" style="text-align:center" | 1991
|style="text-align:center;"|
| 35 || 22 || 0 || 0 || 178 || 147 || 325 || 82 || 29 || 0.0 || 0.0 || 8.1 || 6.7 || 14.8 || 3.7 || 1.3 || 11
|- style="background-color: #EAEAEA"
! scope="row" style="text-align:center" | 1992
|style="text-align:center;"|
| 35 || 19 || 6 || 0 || 139 || 105 || 244 || 52 || 25 || 0.3 || 0.0 || 7.3 || 5.5 || 12.8 || 2.7 || 1.3 || 0
|-
! scope="row" style="text-align:center" | 1993
|style="text-align:center;"|
| 35 || 16 || 1 || 3 || 153 || 102 || 255 || 68 || 20 || 0.1 || 0.2 || 9.6 || 6.4 || 15.9 || 4.3 || 1.3 || 5
|- style="background-color: #EAEAEA"
! scope="row" style="text-align:center" | 1994
|style="text-align:center;"|
| 35 || 22 || 1 || 1 || 214 || 118 || 332 || 86 || 40 || 0.0 || 0.0 || 9.7 || 5.4 || 15.1 || 3.9 || 1.8 || 3
|-
|style="text-align:center;background:#afe6ba;"|1995†
|style="text-align:center;"|
| 35 || 22 || 6 || 2 || 175 || 124 || 299 || 93 || 27 || 0.3 || 0.1 || 8.0 || 5.6 || 13.6 || 4.2 || 1.2 || 4
|- style="background-color: #EAEAEA"
! scope="row" style="text-align:center" | 1996
|style="text-align:center;"|
| 35 || 8 || 0 || 1 || 47 || 39 || 86 || 24 || 11 || 0.0 || 0.1 || 5.9 || 4.9 || 10.8 || 3.0 || 1.4 || 0
|-
! scope="row" style="text-align:center" | 1997
|style="text-align:center;"|
| 35 || 20 || 7 || 1 || 147 || 95 || 242 || 67 || 26 || 0.4 || 0.1 || 7.4 || 4.8 || 12.1 || 3.4 || 1.3 || 0
|- style="background-color: #EAEAEA"
! scope="row" style="text-align:center" | 1998
|style="text-align:center;"|
| 35 || 13 || 5 || 2 || 54 || 38 || 92 || 21 || 10 || 0.4 || 0.2 || 4.2 || 2.9 || 7.1 || 1.6 || 0.8 || 0
|- class="sortbottom"
! colspan=3| Career
! 248
! 41
! 26
! 1946
! 1332
! 3278
! 865
! 252
! 0.2
! 0.1
! 7.8
! 5.4
! 13.2
! 3.5
! 1.3
! 29
|}

References

External links

 Carlton Live

1965 births
Living people
Australian rules footballers from Victoria (Australia)
Carlton Football Club players
Carlton Football Club Premiership players
South Bendigo Football Club players
Victorian State of Origin players
Australia international rules football team players
Two-time VFL/AFL Premiership players